Adrian Richardson is an Australian chef and television presenter.
Richardson has hosted a number of food shows and is most widely known for being the Bad Chef in Good Chef Bad Chef and appearing with chefs Manu Feildel, Gary Mehigan and Miguel Maestre in Boys Weekend. He is owner and head chef at the La Luna restaurant in North Carlton and Bouvier Bar in Brunswick, Melbourne.

Career 
Richardson started working in cafes to pay for pilot lessons. He obtained his pilots license when he was 16.

Chef 
Richardson started in Melbourne at the Victoria Arts Centre and has worked at Le Restaurant at The Regent Hotel, and O’Connell's Hotel with Greg Malouf.

Television

Books
 MEAT, Hardcover (2008): 
 The Good Life, Pan Macmillan, Hardcover (2011).

Personal life 
Richardson has a family history of chefs. He went to school at Penleigh and Essendon Grammar School. His grandfather ran the Balzac restaurant in East Melbourne and he has uncles who were also chefs.

References

Living people
Australian television chefs
Australian restaurateurs
Year of birth missing (living people)